Bhadran is a village in the state of Gujarat, in far western India. It is in the Anand district.  Bhadran was nicknamed the "Paris of Gaekwad state" due to its prosperity and civil works carried out by Maharaja Sayajirao Gaekwad III, the visionary ruler of Baroda. It has been called the greatest village in India by Vallabhbhai Patel.

Legend
Years ago in Padampur, nearly two kilometres away (1.2 miles) from Bhadran town, there used to live two very strong brothers named Bhadrasur and Aghasur. The majority of the people here were very cruel. They defeated Devas with a power graced by Mahadevji. Agonized Devas prayed to the mighty goddess Uma and two Shakties named Bhadrakali and Ambaji, were created.

Bhadrakali and Ambaji killed Bhdrasur and Aghasur respectively so Devas established temples of both Matajis. In due course Padampur was destroyed. In Samvat 1232 (1176 AC) on Sunday the sudi 11(before full moon) of month Vaishakh Bhadrapur, later known as Bhadrn and finally as the time passed, today's Bhadran, was officially formed. Patidar community are the main population.

According to the data for the family tree of the Patels of the seven towns, published in 1925 CE, the first Patel, named Ananda, came from Anklav in Samvat 1415 (1359 AD) and lived here.

Gradually his generations, as new Patels, used to live and settle with them. From the eleventh generation of four brothers, eldest and the second number named Revandas and Dhanjibhai, respectively, started to live in a section called Moti Khadki. Third and fourth numbers named Harkhjibhai and Manjibhai, in another section called Nani Khadki. Together with the above, now, Bhadran is flourishing with the influx of all different communities with new Patels from different places.

Geography and climate

There are three main seasons: Summer, Monsoon and Winter. Aside from the monsoon season, the climate is dry. Cold northerly winds are responsible for a mild chill in January. The southwest monsoon brings a humid climate from mid-June to mid-September. The average rainfall is 93 cm (36.7 inches), but infrequent heavy torrential rains cause the river to flood.

Recent history
Before India's independence, due to advancements in all aspects, Bhadran was known as the Paris of Vadodara State, under the rule of Maharaja Sayajirao Gayakwad. In those days, there was a water supply system. Gayakwad Narrow Gauge Railway used to start from here to Vaso, the same huge Town Hall surrounded by beautiful garden now occupied by Gram Panchayat, on the bank of a huge pond. The town was fortunate to have a drainage system first, when most of the other towns had no dream that such a thing ever existed. People from all over the surrounding areas used to get treatment in the State-run hospital. This is now run by Bhadran Mitramandal (Mumbai Sanchalit) and has been transformed into a small but ideal hospital. It is in the process of expansion to offer all possible types of specialized services, within the capacity of available funds from the donors. For organizing this system, the real credit goes to late Dr. Jamanadas Patel. There is a veterinary hospital for animals too.

Places for social activities include a Guest House, a Rest House, Nani Khadki Dharmshala, Brahman Vadi, Shree Bhadrakali Mataji's Vadi, and Central Hall in Town Hall and Shree Annkshetra.

At different main centres in Bhadran, there are leadership memorials: statues of Shree Sayajirao Gayakwad, Mahatma Gandhi, Sardar Vallbhbhai Patel, Shivabhai Ashabhai Patel, Manubhai Mehta (diwan), and Shree Ratilal Patel, a martyr and victim of a shooting at Adas Station, as a secret agent distributing Freedom Movement leaflets.

Lt. Shivabhai Ashabhai Patel was the follower of Mahatma Gandhi, and the main leader during the Freedom Fighters movement. After Independence (MLA), he used to serve as a president of Grampanchayat and Pragati Mandal. With him, there were two other pioneers of Pragati Mandal, Somabhai Chaturbhai Patel, and Dahyabhai Mathurbhai Patel.

After Independence another freedom fighter, Ambubhai Haribhai Patel, settled in Nairobi, Kenya. There he spent his whole life supporting Jomo Kenyatta to achieve independence for Kenya, without any greed or grabbing for high status from the Prime Minister.

P.C. Patel had offered two precious rooms near Model Cinema on Gandhi road, free of charge for Six Gam Patidar Mandal Office use from 1968 to 1971.  Later, Lt. Madhubhai C Patel, a past secretary (1969) had offered a spacious underground room, free of charge for running this office for many years. Lt. Madhubhai was also a freedom fighter, a strict follower of Mahatma Gandhi and wore Khadi dress for his whole life.

Brother of Shivabhai  Ashabhai Patel, Hirabhai had donated for small-scale home industries for women and General Dispensary. Maganbhai Shankerbhai Patel had donated for the maternity home. Lallubhai shah built a beautiful tower in the centre of bazaar. From then until recent times, it has kept people aware of time. Hardly some were lucky to possess a timepiece then.

Naranbhai Zaverbhai Patel of Laxmi Kooi, went to Africa in 1920, his son Hariharbhai born there in 1927, Naranbhai died two months before his birth. His mother Maniben return to Bhadran in 1928 and lived there till her death in 1995. Hariharbhai moved to Mumbai at age of 15, struggled throughout his life but gave good education to all his four children.

On station road,  Darwaji Bhagol, a triple arch structure, donated by Lt. used to please people passing through it. Recently, Sarvshree Lt. Ramanbhai Patel (Founder of Cadila, Ahmdavad) has donated a large, beautiful triple arch to change the facia (entry) of Bhadran. This leads with double-track road to Chamerda Bhagol. Sarvshree Ramanbhai, as past president (1975; 1981) and a trustee of Chh Gam Patidar Mandal, had played a key role in developing multidirectional progressive social activity reforms and bringing Mandal to latest status. Of course, he had received full cooperation from Ratibhai Rambhai Patel and Madhubhai Chottabhai Patel of Sojitra, Narenbhai Madhubhai Patel of Nadiad and Lt. Pramukhbhai Bhikhabhai Patel (very well known as a chief Engineer of Gujarat, and past president, 1993–1994) of Bhadran. In addition, Ramanbhai used to serve as a trustee of Charutar Vidya Mandal, Vallbh Vidyanagar. He has published a book, "Maha Gujarat Na Gauravshali Patidar". This familiarizes the youth of today about the great ancestors.

Spiritual aspect
For religion, there are temples of every faith such as; Bhdrakali, Mahakali, Ambaji Khodiar, Chamunda, Gayatri, Khaldevi, Ranchhodrayji, Nilkanth Mahadev, Baliadev, Purushottam Bhagvan, Harkhaba's Vaishnav Mandir, Ramji Mandir, Masjid, and Vadtal and Bochasanvasi Swaminarayan temples, for men and women separately. Over and above, there are ashrams of Shreemad Rajchndra, Shree Madhvanandji, Shree Muktanandji, Shree Kupanand Swami, Shree Shanti Ashram and Sthanakvasi Upashray. Here, people enjoy and celebrate every religious occasion.

Bhadran is proud to be a holy town. Consider the Patel families had given fifteen St. Jewels. They are no more in this world. The list:

 Khushalji
 Mithaji
 Ramji
 Lalluji
 Narottamji
 Purushottamji
 Zaverji
 Hathiji
 Natha Rakhji
 Mulji Rakhji
 Shankerji
 Parshottamji
 Ishwarlaji
 Bhanuchandraji

In recent times, Dada Bhagwan (Patel Ambalal) has been seen on every wall in Bhadran as the fifteenth, in the form of slogans of wisdom.

Param Pujya Dada Bhagwan was nurtured in this city. He had a detailed study of many scriptures and was in search of the answers to questions such as: ‘Who is governing this universe?’ ‘Who is the doer?’ After spontaneous enlightenment, on the Surat railway station in June 1958, he obtained the answers to these questions and more. He was able to establish a link with Shree Simandhar Swami in Mahavideh Kshetra.

In the outskirts of Bhadran, is located a Dada Bhagwan Trimandir made up of white marble, wherein reside Shree Simandhar Swami, Lord Shiva, Lord Krishna, many celestial deities along with Bhadrakali Maa.

Economy
The main economy of this village is agriculture. The main cash crop is tobacco, and tobacco processing is an important industry. The other crops with considerable area are bananas, rice, bajra, and cotton to some extent.

Bhadran is a rural financial center of Anand district.  Banking and customer services are offered at Bank of Baroda, Dena Bank, Peoples Co-op Bank, Mercantile Co-op Bank, Kheda-Jilla Madhyasth Co-op Bank, the post office, Landing and customer Co-op, and at societies as, Seva Co-op, and Milk Producers' Co-op.  Its sound co-operative banks have helped the region prosper and progress.

Education
Bhadran has educational institutions for the development of children at every level.
There are both free and paid schools, with all types of facilities for education from kindergarten to graduation.  These include boys' and girls' separate schools at the primary level, Tulsibhai Bakorbhai Amin High School, Science and Commerce College, Computer Centre, English Medium School from Nursery to H.S.C. classes, Gymnasium Centre and Jethabhai Narayanbhai Patels, and the Shambhuprasad Boarding House for students from out of town. In addition, we have Kankuba Women's Library with an industrial training center for women, Maganbhai Kashibhai Patel Public Library, and the M.D. Khhakhhar Children's Library. All different establishments are well managed by Pragati Mandal, Mitra Mandal, Nagarik Mandal etc.

Neighborhoods of Bhadran
The neighborhoods are: 
Juni Khadaki No: 1 & 2, Now Bhadra Chowk 1 & 2, Vanta, Rana And Patel Street, Moti Chowk, Prajapatiwas, Dabhasi Mahollo, Paatvi Nagar, Jeerawad, Kot Faliyu, Darvaji Bhagol, Khardevi Road, Station Road, Lakshmikui, Vrajawas, Bhoiwado(Alkapuri), Sona Tekri, Borsad Road, College Road, Limada Street, Dassbhai No Mahollo, Devidas no Tekroe, Sattar Gharni Pol, Subhash Chowk, Bhramporiya Kuwa, Wadi Faliyu, Vad Faliyu, Nani Khadki, Sarkar Wado, Mahadev Street, Royal Street, Navi Khadki, Bramhanni Wadi, Raikwad street, Trivedi no Tekroe, Pandya no Tekroe, Bazaar,  Vanivad, Kadi Faliyu, Kothi Faliyu, Laldass Mahollo, Moti Khadki, Patavi Mahollo, Undu Faliyua,  Solaidas no Mahollo, Kanji Bapu ni Khadki, Vahridas ni Khadki, Vankar Was, Harshad Pol, Police Line, Vaghari Was, Dada ni Khad, Nani Brahrampol, Sardar Avas, Isvarakrupa Society, Pratappura, Raval Was, Malek Vago, Roheet Was, Harijan Was, Rabari Was, Chauhan Was and Rathod Was.

Also these outpost are considered in Bhadran: Tolvad, Jembudi, Ghojari, Samdhar & Nathovago.

Projects for development
The following are some of the projects that have been completed and some which are under construction:
 Water tower near Brahmpole Well
 Water pumping station on existing Brahmpole Well
 The Computer Centre with English Medium School
 The Bhadran Crematorium near Mahankaleshwar Mahadev
 The Leisure Centre or Health Centre (Old Akhado) near the bus station.

The following projects are already designed and will be built in near future when the funds are available:
 the two-storey Shambuprasad Boarding House on Borsad Road, next to old Akhado;
 the bus station at Chamarda Bhagol and near Sayagi Rao Statue;
 refurbishment of old two Water Supply Towers No 1 Sayaji Water Works and No 2;
 Rain Water Disposal Scheme from Pratap Pura to Hospital Old and New.

The following projects are to be designed and plans are to be drawn in the near future:
 The refurbishment of Town Hall.
 The sewage disposal scheme at existing place.
 The refurbishment of the girls and boys primary schools.
 The children's play park at the site of old Malav Talav near Bhadri Kali Temple.
 The existing hospital is to be taken over from Mitre Manual in Bombay.  The existing building is to be modernized, adding a new maternity ward and living accommodations for doctors and nurses.
 The resurfacing of all roads in the town, either in concrete or tarmac.
 Prime Minister Shri Narendra Modi Launched " SWACHHA BHARAT (CLEAN INDIA) MISSION "  this village is full support to this mission since last 30 or 40 years every day  neat & clean by sweeper by under and implemented honorable Late Shri Nagin Bapu

See also
 Anand district

References

Bhadran Bandhu Samaj UK
Falling Rain

External links
Bhadran Samaj of America

Villages in Anand district